Shinyanga, also known as Mji wa Shinyanga in the national language, is a city in northern Tanzania. The city is the location of the regional headquarters of Shinyanga Region as well as the district headquarters of Shinyanga Urban District. The region and district are named after the town.

Location
Shinyanga is located in Shinyanga District, in Shinyanga Region, in northern Tanzania. The coordinates of the city are: 3°39′43″S 33°25′23″E / 3.661945°S 33.423056°E / -3.661945; 33.423056.

Population
The 2002 national census estimated the population of Shinyanga at about 93,000.  The 2012 national census listed the population of Shinyanga Municipal Council at 161,391.  According to a 21 June 2022 news article in Afrik21 the population now exceeds 200,000.

Landmarks
The current seven landmarks in the city of Shinyanga or near its borders, include the following:

 The headquarters of Kahama Regional Administration
 The headquarters of Shinyanga Urban District
 The offices of Shinyanga City Council
 Shinyanga Central Market
 Shinyanga General Hospital
 Shinyanga City Stadium - A public stadium administered by Shinyanga City Council
 Williamson Diamond mine.

Transport

Railway
Shinyanga is served by the Shinyanga Railway Station as a branch of the Central Railway of Tanzania.

Airport
Shinyanga Airport is located  along Mwanza road in Ibadakuli Area.

Road
Shinyanga is served by the Tabora-Mwanza Highway. The highway passes conveniently through the center of Shinyanga.

Reforestation
The region has a forest restoration program which is well documented by the Food and Agriculture Organization, United Nations Environment Programme and the Global Partnership on Forest Landscape Restoration. The programme is featured in the film Forests for the 21st Century.

References

Cities in the Great Rift Valley
Populated places in Shinyanga Region
Regional capitals in Tanzania